Kerċem Ajax Football Club is a Gozitan, Malta, football club from the village of Kerċem, which plays in the Gozo First Division. Kerċem Ajax won the Gozitan Second Division 2011–2012 season with 50 points, an unbeaten season. Ajax won other two competitions in Gozitan football competitions, the Second Division Knock-Out against Munxar Falcons with the score of 2–0 and the Second Division Super Cup against Munxar Falcons with the score of 7–0. Ajax was promoted to Gozo First Division for the season 2012–2013. They beat Nadur Youngsters in 2013 winning the GFA Cup; the whites had the distinction of holding high all Gozo's 5 trophies. The Greens also introduced to the Maltese football players like Alfred Effiong and Jeremiah Ani apart from former international players like Stoyko Sakaliev.
The Greens won in 1985 the Gozo First Division and at other times the GFA Cup, GFA Super Cup, Independence Cup and Freedom Day Cup.

Achievements
Gozo First Division Champions: 1985/86

1st Division League – Runners Up
3 times:	1980/1981, 2005/2006, 2012/2013

2nd Division League – Champions
5 times:	1953/1954, 1975/1976, 1986/1987, 1999/2000, 2011/2012

2nd Division League – Runners Up
4 times:	1982/1983, 1983/1984, 1984/1985, 1989/1990

1st Division League – Premier League Format – Runners Up
1 time:	1997/1998

2nd Division League – Premier League Format – Champions
1 time:	1996/1997

GFA Cup – Winners
2 times:	2005/2006, 2012/2013

GFA Cup – Runners Up
3 times:	1990/1991, 2000/2001, 2009/2010

1st Division Super Cup – Winners
1 time:	2005/2006

2nd Division Super Cup – Winners
1 time:	2010/2011

1st & 2nd Division Knock Out – Winners
1 time:	1998/1999

1st Division Knock Out – Premier League Format – Runners Up
1 time:	1997/1998, 2013/2014

2nd Division Knock Out – Premier League Format – Winners
1 time:	1996/1997

Independence Cup – Runners Up
2 times:	2004/2005, 2005/2006

2nd Division Knock Out – Winners
3 times:	1978/1979, 1981/1982, 2011/2012

2nd Division Knock Out – Runners Up
1 time:	2010/2011

Isostar Cup – Winners
1 time:	1995/1996

Freedom Day Cup Cup – Runners Up
1 time:	1981/1982

Challenge Cup – Winners
2 times:	1974/1975, 1976/1977

Renton Cup – Winners
1 time:	1985/1986

Good Conduct Cup – Winners
3 times:	1973/1974, 1975/1976, 1981/1982

Dingli's Cup – Runners Up
2 times:	1953/1954, 1956/1957

Under 21 League – Winners
1 time:	2007/2008

Under 18 League – Champions
2 times:	1996/1997, 1997/1998

Under 16 – Champions
1 time:	1999/2000

Under 16 Knock Out – Runners Up
1 time:	2005/2006

Under 14 League – Champions
2 times:	1997/1998, 2003/2004

Under 14 Knock Out – Winners
1 time:	2003/2004

Under 12 League – Runners Up
1 time:	2001/2002

Administration

Current staff

Players

Current squad

Out on Loan

<small>Loan deals expire 30 June 2015

External links
Kerċem Ajax on Facebook
GozoFootball Club Profile

Football clubs in Malta
Gozitan football clubs
Association football clubs established in 1953
1953 establishments in Malta
Kerċem